Beda is an unincorporated community in Covington County, Alabama, United States. The community lies entirely within the Conecuh National Forest.

History
A post office operated under the name Beda from 1886 to 1897.

References

Unincorporated communities in Covington County, Alabama
Unincorporated communities in Alabama